"Tight Rope" is the debut 1972 hit single by singer-songwriter Leon Russell.  It was the lead track on his LP, Carney.

The song became his highest-charting single on the US, reaching number 11 and number 10 on the Cash Box'' Top 100.  In Canada, it reached number five.

This song is a circus metaphor about clinging to life while being on a high wire.

In the instrumental section, this song quotes a couple of times, a slow version of the  "Entrance of the Gladiators" March, played in a mysterious descending scale, before Russell finishes the last half of the bridge section.

The B-side of 45 RPM for "Tight Rope" was "This Masquerade", also penned by Russell, which became a Top 10 hit for George Benson in 1976.

Chart performance

Weekly charts

Year-end charts

References

External links
 

1972 songs
1972 singles
Leon Russell songs
Songs written by Leon Russell
Song recordings produced by Denny Cordell
Shelter Records singles